Hero Oomkens von Esens (c. 1455 – 1522) was a Frisian nobleman, the Earl of Harlingerland. He inherited the title upon the death of his father, Sibet Attena von Esens, in 1473.

Other names 

He is usually referred to as Hero Oomkens "the Younger" to distinguish him from his maternal grandfather, Hero Oomkens the Elder. As with most names of this period, Hero Oomkens von Esens is referred to by a plethora of variations in contemporary texts (e.g. Hero, Here, Heer, Her; Omken, Omcken, Oemkens, Omkens). Moreover, given that he had held various lordships, he is also referred to, in addition to von or zu Esens, as von Wittmund, von Harlingerland, von Stedesdorf, etc.

Family 

The Oomkens family was  established in East Frisia (now part of Niedersachsen in Germany) and in the Frisian Oldambt, in the Groninger Ommelanden (now part of Groningen in the Netherlands). The family prided itself on its direct descent from Radbod, King of the Frisians.

Hero Oomkens von Esens' marriage to Irmgard, daughter of Gerhard VI, Count of Oldenburg in 1489 helped to cement the alliance of the old Frisian aristocracy with the Counts of Oldenburg in their struggle against the rise of the Cirksena family.

Hero Oomkens von Esens had five sons, Balthasar, Melchior, Caspar, Johann and Sibo. They had two daughters. Onna (or Anna) married Otto von Rietberg, and Adelaide married her distant cousin Eppo Hayo Heres Oomkens van Ommeland of the Oldambt in the Groninger Ommeland.

Balthasar Oomkens von Esens succeeded his father on the latter's death in 1522. Sibo and Caspar joined their cousin, the King of Denmark, and died on active service with the Danes, with Caspar dying during the storming of Königsberg in 1521.

Heraldic crest 

Hero Oomkens von Esens' heraldic crest consisted of two crossed tournament lances (sometimes incorrectly referred to as whips or scourges), which were incorporated into the arms of the city of Wittmund (district), and are also featured in the arms of East Frisia.

References 

 Ubbo Emmius, Rerum Frisicarum Historia, Leiden 1616
 H. Perizonius, Geschichte Ostfrieslands, Weener 1868
 G.A. von Halem, Geschichte des Herzogtums Oldenburg, Bremen 1794
 Allgemeine/Neue Deutsche Biographie
 Biographisches Lexikon für Ostfriesland
 Anonymous, Chronika van den Groten Daden der Graven van Oldenborch, circa 1537, published by Isensee Verlag, Oldenburg, 1993.

1450s births
Year of birth uncertain
1522 deaths
People from East Frisia
East Frisians
Hero
Dutch nobility